The Women's Rugby Super Series is an international rugby union tournament that features the top-ranked women's teams in the world. The Super Series succeeded the Women's Nations Cup in 2015. The tournament began with four teams in 2015 and was played as a round-robin. The number of teams increased to five in 2019. New Zealand won the inaugural tournament.

Results

Team records

See also 

 Women's international rugby - includes all women's international match results

References 

 
Women's rugby union competitions for national teams